Oscar Kempthorne (January 31, 1919 – November 15, 2000) was a British statistician and geneticist known for his research on randomization-analysis and the design of experiments, which had wide influence on research in agriculture, genetics, and other areas of science.

Born in St Tudy, Cornwall and educated in England, Kempthorne moved to the United States, where he was for many decades a professor of statistics at Iowa State University.

Randomization analysis

Kempthorne developed a randomization-based approach to the statistical analysis of randomized experiments, which was expounded in pioneering textbooks and articles. Kempthorne's insistence on randomization followed the early writings of Ronald Fisher, especially on randomized experiments.

Kempthorne is the founder of the "Iowa school" of experimental design and analysis of variance. Kempthorne and many of his former doctoral students have often emphasized the use of the randomization distribution under the null hypothesis. Kempthorne was skeptical of "statistical models" (of  populations), when such models are proposed by statisticians rather than created using objective randomization procedures.

Kempthorne's randomization-analysis has influenced the causal model of Donald Rubin; in turn, Rubin's randomization-based analysis and his work with Rosenbaum on propensity score matching influenced Kempthorne's analysis of covariance.

Model-based analysis
Oscar Kempthorne was skeptical towards (and often critical of) model-based inference, particularly two influential alternatives: Kempthorne was skeptical of, first, neo-Fisherian statistics, which is inspired by the later writings of Ronald A. Fisher and by the contemporary writings of David R. Cox and John Nelder; neo-Fisherian statistics emphasizes likelihood functions of parameters.

Second, Kempthorne was skeptical of Bayesian statistics, which use not only likelihoods but also probability distributions on parameters. Nonetheless, while subjective probability and Bayesian inference were viewed skeptically by Kempthorne,  Bayesian experimental design was defended. In the preface to his second volume with Hinkelmann (2004), Kempthorne wrote,

We strongly believe that design of experiment is a Bayesian experimentation process, ...  one in which the experimenter approaches the experiment with some beliefs, to which he accommodates the design. (xxii)

Bibliography

Writings about Oscar Kempthorne

See also

 Analysis of variance
 Bayesian experimental design
 Biostatistics ("Biometry" or "Biometrics")
 Design of experiments
 Genetics
 Optimal design
 Philosophy of science
 Philosophy of statistics
 Random assignment
 Randomization
 Randomized block design
 Randomized clinical trial

Notes

External links
 

Presidents of the Institute of Mathematical Statistics
Fellows of the American Statistical Association
Fellows of the American Association for the Advancement of Science
American statisticians
Rothamsted statisticians
British statisticians
Biostatisticians
American geneticists
Iowa State University faculty
Alumni of Clare College, Cambridge
1919 births
2000 deaths
People from St Tudy
American people of Cornish descent
British emigrants to the United States
20th-century American philosophers